The Pangti Story is a 2017 Naga documentary film by Kohima-based film maker Sesino Yhoshü. The film explores the transition of an entire village from one that slaughtered thousands of Amur Falcons, the longest travelling raptors in the world, who fly from Siberia every fall to roost in Pangti, a Lotha Naga village in Nagaland, to becoming their most fervent preservationists. The film won the 65th National Film Awards for Best Environment Film.

Production
Production began in 2015 with TAKE ONE production team making two trips to Pangti village in Wokha District, Nagaland. Footages of the bird were taken on the first trip with ground research done at Pangti. The second trip was with more filming done in Pangti, Wokha and Dimapur.

Accolades
The film won the Golden Beaver Award at the 7th National Science Film Festival held in 2017. In 2018, the film was adjudged the Best Environment Film including Best Agricultural Film in the non-feature category at the 65th National Film Awards held in 2017.

See also
 Amur Falcon

References

External links
 

Indian documentary films
2017 documentary films
Naga people
Films shot in Nagaland
Nagamese-language films
2017 films